In Whyte notation, a 2-4-6 is a steam locomotive with two unpowered leading wheels followed by four powered driving wheels and six unpowered trailing wheels.

Equivalent classifications
Other equivalent classifications are:
UIC classification: 1B3 (also known as German classification and Italian classification)
French classification: 123
Turkish classification: 26
Swiss classification: 2/6

The equivalent UIC classification is 1'B3' (or (1'B)'3' for a Mason Bogie).

Examples
This unusual wheel arrangement does not appear to have been used on the mainline railways in the UK. It was, however, one of the configurations used on the Mason Bogie articulated locomotives, in the US during the 1880s. Two examples were constructed at the Mason Machine Works for the narrow gauge Boston, Revere Beach and Lynn Railroad in 1892. 

4,2-4-6

fr:122 (locomotive)